Just Imagination is an album from honky-tonk singer Webb Pierce that was released in 1958 on the Decca label (DL 8728). It was Pierce's third album, following the success of Webb Pierce (1955) and The Wondering Boy (1956).

Track listing
Side A
 "A New Love Affair"
 "I Care No More"
 "Don't Be That One"
 "I Know (It Was You)"
 "Just Imagination"
 I Love You Dear"

Side B
 "Who Wouldn't Love You"
 "Call Me Your Sweetheart"
 I Found a True Love"
 "I'm Only Wishin'"
 "Too Late to Worry Now"
 "I'll Get by Somehow"

References

1958 albums
Webb Pierce albums